Supernova is a 2005 television miniseries directed by John Harrison and featuring an ensemble cast led by Luke Perry and Peter Fonda. It originally aired on the Hallmark Channel.  The series is of the disaster genre and has a large number of special effects. It was filmed on location in Cape Town, South Africa and Sydney, Australia.

Plot summary
A worldwide scientific conference is taking place in Sydney, Australia when Dr. Austin Shepard (Peter Fonda) suddenly disappears. Dr. Shepard's colleague, Christopher Richardson (Luke Perry) and other individuals are soon faced with the reality of an impending crisis and an attempt to keep the information from the public. While a full-blown supernova does not occur, explosions on the Sun cause massive damage in Australia and in various other parts of the world. During the impending chaos an old enemy of Richardson's wife escapes from prison and immediately sets out to kill her and her daughter.

Cast
Luke Perry as Dr. Chris Richardson
Tia Carrere as Lisa Delgado
Peter Fonda as Dr. Austin Shepard
Lance Henriksen as Col. Harlan Williams
Clemency Burton-Hill as Ginny McKillip
Emma Samms as Laurie Stephenson
Jessica Brooks as Brooke Richardson
Eliza Bennett as Haley Richardson
Philip Lenkowsky as Grant Cole

Locations in the film
The film features many scenes of worldwide devastation. Notable locations include:
 Paris, France-The Eiffel Tower is damaged by massive lightning bolts.
 Tokyo, Japan-suffers a power outage
 St. Louis, Missouri, United States-The Gateway Arch, Old Courthouse, and the Busch Memorial Stadium are destroyed by a plasma meteor shower from the Sun.
 Maldives-bombarded by a plasma meteor shower
 Sahara Desert-bombarded by a plasma meteor shower, which turns some of its sand dunes into glass
 Taj Mahal, India-destroyed by a plasma meteor shower
 Sydney, Australia-This city is the main setting of the film and the Sydney Tower is destroyed and the Sydney Opera House damaged in a plasma meteor shower.
 South African Astronomical Observatory-This is used as the observatory in the film that Shepard and his colleagues use.

External links
 
 

2005 television films
2005 films
American disaster films
Films set in Sydney
Films shot in Sydney
Films shot in South Africa
Hallmark Channel original films
Fiction about supernovae
Films directed by John Harrison (director)
2000s American films